Nick Matuhin (born as Nikita Matuhin  on 5 April 1990 in Moscow, Russian SFSR, Soviet Union) is an amateur German freestyle wrestler, who competed in the men's super heavyweight category. He is currently a member of SC Luckenwalde in Luckenwalde, Brandenburg, and is coached and trained by four-time Olympian Alexander Leipold. Matuhin stands 1.98 metres (6 ft 6 in) tall, and weighs 120 kilograms (265 lb).

Matuhin qualified for the men's 120 kg class at the 2012 Summer Olympics in London by placing second from the Olympic Qualification Tournament in Taiyuan, China. At the Olympics, he received a bye for the preliminary round of sixteen match, before losing to Uzbekistani wrestler and two-time Olympic champion Artur Taymazov, with a two-set technical score (0–4, 0–2), and a classification point score of 0–3. Because his opponent advanced into the final, Matuhin was entered into the repechage rounds which decide the bronze medals. He was defeated in the first round of the repechage by Iran's Komeil Ghasemi, who was able to score one point each in two straight periods, leaving Matuhin without a single point.

References

External links
NBC Olympics Profile
 

German male sport wrestlers
1990 births
Living people
Olympic wrestlers of Germany
Wrestlers at the 2012 Summer Olympics
Sportspeople from Luckenwalde
Sportspeople from Moscow
European Games competitors for Germany
Wrestlers at the 2015 European Games
Russian emigrants to Germany
Naturalized citizens of Germany
Wrestlers at the 2019 European Games